Eulucane Ndagijimana is a Rwandan Olympic middle-distance runner. He represented his country in the men's 1500 meters and the men's 800 meters at the 1988 Summer Olympics. His time was a 1:52.08 in the 800, and a 3:51.61 in the 1500 heats.

References 

1961 births
Living people
Rwandan male middle-distance runners
Olympic athletes of Rwanda
Athletes (track and field) at the 1988 Summer Olympics